Swiss cheese plant may refer to:

 Monstera deliciosa, a species of flowering plant native to tropical forests of southern Mexico, south to Panama
 Monstera adansonii, a species of flowering plant widespread across much of South America and Central America